Bettache is a surname. Notable people with the surname include:

 Faysal Bettache (born 2000), English professional footballer
 Mustapha Bettache (1931–2005), Moroccan professional footballer